American thrash metal band Megadeth has released sixteen studio albums, six live albums, seven compilation albums, one EP, forty-nine singles, ten video albums, and forty-four music videos. After he was fired from Metallica in 1983, guitarist and vocalist Dave Mustaine formed Megadeth along with bassist Dave Ellefson, guitarist Greg Handevidt, and drummer Richard Girod. The band toured and gained a following, signing with the independent label Combat Records in late 1984. Megadeth's debut album Killing Is My Business... and Business Is Good! (1985), sold very well for an independent release, and the group attracted the attention of major record labels. By the end of the year, the group signed with Capitol Records. Megadeth's first major-label album, Peace Sells... but Who's Buying?, was released in 1986.

Before the recording of the band's third album, Mustaine fired Poland and Samuelson; they were replaced by Jeff Young and Chuck Behler, respectively. The new lineup debuted on So Far, So Good... So What! in early 1988. Later that year, Mustaine fired Young and Behler and replaced them with guitarist Marty Friedman and drummer Nick Menza. This lineup recorded Megadeth's fourth album, Rust in Peace, which was released in late 1990. The singles "Holy Wars... The Punishment Due" and "Hangar 18" reached the top 30 in Ireland and the United Kingdom. Megadeth's most commercially successful album, Countdown to Extinction (1992), peaked at number 2 on the Billboard 200 chart, and was the band's first record to be certified platinum at its release year by the Recording Industry Association of America (RIAA). Megadeth's biggest hit single is "Symphony of Destruction", which peaked at number 71 on the Billboard Hot 100 chart and in the top 15 in Ireland and the United Kingdom.

Youthanasia (1994) peaked at number 4 on the Billboard 200, and like its predecessor, it was certified platinum by the RIAA. The singles "Train of Consequences" and "A Tout le Monde", reached the top 30 on the US Mainstream Rock chart. The following year Megadeth released Hidden Treasures, an EP that featured previously released non-album tracks, including soundtrack and compilation songs. Cryptic Writings (1997) peaked at number 10 on the Billboard 200, and became the group's sixth consecutive studio album to be certified platinum in the US. The release scored the band's highest-charting single to date, "Trust", which peaked at number 5 on the Mainstream Rock chart. Later that year, Menza was fired from the band and was replaced by drummer Jimmy DeGrasso. The following year, Risk was released, and was a critical and commercial failure. In 2000, Friedman left Megadeth and was replaced by guitarist Al Pitrelli. After signing with Sanctuary Records, the group debuted their new lineup on The World Needs a Hero (2001). In early 2002, Mustaine suffered an arm injury, which led him to announce in a press release that Megadeth had disbanded.

In 2004, Megadeth released The System Has Failed. Although intended to be a solo album by Mustaine, outstanding contractual obligations with the band's European label EMI forced him to release one more album under the "Megadeth" name. Mustaine officially reformed Megadeth, recruiting guitarist Glen Drover and drummer Shawn Drover, along with bassist James MacDonough, who would be replaced by James LoMenzo before having the chance to play on a record. United Abominations was released in 2007, and peaked at number 8 on the Billboard 200. Endgame was released in 2009, and marked the debut of guitarist Chris Broderick, who replaced Drover the previous year. The record peaked at number 9 on the Billboard 200. In 2010, founding bassist David Ellefson rejoined the band; the new lineup would go on to release Thirteen in 2011, and Super Collider in 2013, which respectively peaked at number 11 and number 6 on the Billboard 200, making Super Collider the band's highest-charting album since 1994's Youthanasia.

In 2015, Drover and Broderick quit the band, and were respectively replaced by Lamb of God drummer Chris Adler and Angra guitarist Kiko Loureiro. Dystopia was released in 2016, and won "Best Metal Performance" at the 59th Grammy Awards, making this the band's first Grammy Award after 11 nominations. Adler was quickly replaced by drummer Dirk Verbeuren in July 2016.

Ellefson was dismissed on May 14, 2021 due to a sex scandal, and was replaced by former bassist James LoMenzo, first as a touring member, then as a permanent member. The Sick, the Dying... and the Dead! was released in September 2022, with bass tracks recorded by Testament bassist Steve DiGiorgio.

Albums

Studio albums

Live albums

Compilation albums

Video albums

EPs

Singles

Music videos

Notes

A   "À Tout le Monde (Set Me Free)" and "Sleepwalker" were released together as a double A-side single in the Netherlands.

References

Citations

Sources

External links

 
 
 

Heavy metal group discographies
Discography
Discographies of American artists